The year 1848 in architecture involved some significant events.

Events
 Joseph-Louis Lambot develops ferrocement, the forerunner of reinforced concrete.
 Louisa Caroline Huggins Tuthill publishes History of Architecture from the Earliest Times, the first history of architecture to be published in the United States.

Buildings and structures

Buildings

 April 8 – Newmarket railway station in Suffolk, England is opened.
 May 1 – Stamford railway station in Lincolnshire, England, designed by Sancton Wood, is opened.
 June 19 – Monkwearmouth railway station in north-east England, designed by Thomas Moore, is opened.
 October – The Palm house at the Royal Botanic Gardens, Kew (London), designed by architect Decimus Burton and iron-founder Richard Turner, is completed and opened.
 October 9 – Stoke-on-Trent railway station in north Staffordshire, England, designed by H. A. Hunt, is opened.
 October 12 – Gobowen railway station in Shropshire, England, designed by Thomas Mainwaring Penson, is opened.
 October 25 – Cochituate Aqueduct, feeding Boston, Massachusetts, is completed; its gatehouses contain the earliest surviving wrought-iron roof structures and cast-iron staircases in the United States.
 November 1 – Mortimer railway station in Berkshire, England, designed by I. K. Brunel, is opened.
 November 20 – St. Michael's Cathedral (Sitka, Alaska) is completed.
 The Thorvaldsen Museum of sculpture in Copenhagen, designed by Michael Gottlieb Bindesbøll, is opened.
 The Sofiensaal in Vienna, converted into a ballroom by Eduard van der Nüll and August Sicard von Sicardsburg, is inaugurated.
 Construction of Cisternoni of Livorno in Italy, designed by Pasquale Poccianti, concludes with completion of Cisternino di città.

Awards
 RIBA Royal Gold Medal – Charles Robert Cockerell.
 Grand Prix de Rome, architecture: Charles Garnier.

Births
 William Frame, English architect working in Wales (died 1906)
 Luigi Manini, Italian architect and set designer working in Portugal (died 1936)
 William Henry Miller, American architect based in Ithaca, New York (died 1922)

Deaths
 Thomas Duff, Irish ecclesiastical architect (born 1792)

References

Architecture
Years in architecture
19th-century architecture